Roland Stoltz may refer to:

 Roland Stoltz (ice hockey, born 1931) (1931–2001), Swedish ice hockey defenceman
 Roland Stoltz (ice hockey, born 1954) (born 1954), retired Swedish ice hockey defenceman

See also
 Stoltz (disambiguation)